Honest is a British comedy-drama series that aired on ITV in 2008. The series is a remake of the New Zealand series Outrageous Fortune, written by James Griffin and Rachel Lang, that first aired in 2005.

The programme stars Amanda Redman as Lindsay Carter, a mother of four who decides that her criminal family is going to change its ways after her husband is sent to prison. Honest also stars Danny Webb, Sean Pertwee and Camille Coduri.

Production
Most of the filming was carried out in Staines, including at the local school, Matthew Arnold.

Cast

Main cast

Recurring cast

Broadcast Dates
The first episode aired on Wednesday 9 January 2008 at 21:00. It pulled in an average audience of 6 million viewers, winning the 21:00 slot with a 24% share. However, the second episode figures fell to 4.3 million viewers (17%) , in competition with the second season premier of Torchwood on the BBC, and the third episode declined further to 3.7 million viewers (15%) . Episode 4 saw an increase of one percentage point from the previous week to 3.9 million viewers (16%) . However Episode 5 dropped to 3.2 million viewers, reflecting direct competition with Fabio Capello's debut as England football manager on Match of the Day. The final installment saw figures rally by 800,000 to 4 million, an increase of 17% taking second place in the 9pm slot to Channel 4's Grand Designs . The figures average at 4.18 million per week.

DVD releases
Honest was released on DVD in Region 2 on 18 February 2008.

References

External links

2000s British drama television series
2008 British television series debuts
2008 British television series endings
British comedy-drama television shows
ITV television dramas
2000s British television miniseries
Television series produced at Pinewood Studios
English-language television shows
Television shows set in England